Dr. Dolittle 2 (also known as Doctor Dolittle 2) is a 2001 American fantasy comedy film and a sequel to the 1998 film Dr. Dolittle. It was written by Larry Levin, one of the co-writers of Dr. Dolittle, and directed by Steve Carr. The film stars Eddie Murphy in the main role, Kristen Wilson, Jeffrey Jones, and Kevin Pollak.

It tells the story of Dr. Dolittle as he tries to help the animals protect their forest from unscrupulous human developers. He decides to populate the forest with a species of animal that the law protects, and enlists the help of Ava (voiced by Lisa Kudrow), a lone Pacific western bear living in the condemned forest. To provide her with a mate, Dolittle turns to Archie (voiced by Steve Zahn), a wise-cracking circus-performing bear.

This is the last Dr. Dolittle film to feature Eddie Murphy in the lead role, before Kyla Pratt assumed the lead role in future films, starting with Dr. Dolittle 3 in 2006. It is also the last Dr. Dolittle film to feature Raven-Symoné as Charisse Dolittle.

Plot
Three years after the events of the first film, veterinarian Dr. John Dolittle's ability to talk to animals has made him famous, and he travels the world performing his skills. Returning home from France, he gives his daughter Maya a chameleon named Pepito, and punishes his other daughter Charisse for doing poorly in school, confiscating her phone for a week. Charisse's boyfriend Eric joins the family for Charisse's 16th birthday party, where an opossum and a raccoon named Joey tell John that their boss, the Godbeaver (Godfather of the rodent mafia), wants to see him. John meets the Godbeaver and agrees to save the forest from being cut down by mating an endangered female Pacific western bear with a male.

At a circus, John persuades Archie, the sole surviving Pacific western male, to accompany him to the forest and become a real bear. John takes his family on a month-long vacation to the forest, where he makes a deal with the sole surviving Pacific western female bear named Ava, who is involved with a male Kodiak bear named Sonny. She agrees not to make any decisions for a month after John promises to turn Archie into a bear she will love.

Struggling to train Archie, who is used to the pampered lifestyle, John hires the local forest creatures to chaperone Charisse and Eric, and neglects his wife Lisa. After assuring Archie that he will find a way to win Ava's heart, John attempts to win Lisa back by dancing in their cabin, with every animal in the forest watching, but Lucky the dog accidentally ruins it.

Archie attempts to get Ava's attention by imitating John singing, but falls from a tree branch. Humiliated, he refuses to leave his new-found cave, but becomes frustrated with John's insults and knocks him into a muddy hole, finally listening to his "inner bear". Later, Archie spends the day with Ava, whose relationship with Sonny is declining. Lucky tries to woo a female wolf, successfully urinating around her territory, but is interrupted by one of her packmates before she agrees to go out with him. Meanwhile, Sonny forces Ava to leave Archie.

Logging magnate Joseph Potter and his lawyer Jack Riley attempt to make a deal with John to spare some parts of the forest, until Archie tells John he has prepared his "big finish" to win Ava and goes after a beehive at the edge of a tall hill, ignoring John's warnings and the attacking bees who also attack a nearby Riley. He manages to get the hive, finally winning Ava's heart and the respect of the other forest animals. Ava then dumps Sonny, finally having had enough of his rudeness to Archie.

In a game of hide and seek with Ava, Archie is tranquilized by Riley. John learns that Archie had somewhat destroyed the back of a restaurant. After getting information from a weasel, John visits Archie in jail, telling him that he may be too dangerous to go free and will be sold to a Mexican circus, ending John's chance of saving the forest. John realizes that Charisse has developed her father's gift of talking to animals, reigniting his determination to save the forest. He rallies the animals of the forest not to give up without a fight and free Archie. Charisse, Eric, and Maya rebel against the loggers with the aid of wolves, while word of Archie's predicament spreads, leading animals around the world to go on strike.

At Potter Wood Industries, Mr. Potter and Riley are attacked by the animals. While Riley takes the brunt from the birds, wolves, and bees, Mr. Potter is cornered by Ava and Joey, forcing him to finally start negotiating with John and the animals. As the negotiations go on, the strike continues to grow with several animal pros like race horses and Shamu getting in on the act. Finally, a deal is made and the Dolittles and animals accept, freeing Archie and saving the entire forest outside San Francisco.

John and Charisse become closer, talking with and helping animals together, while Archie and Ava mate and have two cubs who try to take after their father.

Cast
 Eddie Murphy as Dr. John Dolittle, a doctor who can talk to animals.
 Kristen Wilson as Lisa Dolittle, the wife of John.
 Jeffrey Jones as Joseph Potter, a logging magnate and head of Potter Wood Industries.
 Kevin Pollak as Jack Riley, Potter's lawyer.
 Raven-Symoné as Charisse Dolittle, the daughter of John who later learns to talk to animals.
 Kyla Pratt as Maya Dolittle, the daughter of John.
 Lil Zane as Eric, Charisse's boyfriend and pizza delivery man.
 James Avery as Eldon, Eric's father.
 Elayn J. Taylor as Eldon's wife
 Andy Richter as Eugene Wilson
 Mark Griffin as Logger
 Mark Griffin also voices the Nature Show Narrator
 Ken Hudson Campbell as Animal Control Officer
 Victor Raider-Wexler as Judge B. Duff, a judge who oversees the cases involving Dolittle and Potter.
 Steve Irwin as The Crocodile Hunter, John once went with him on one of his nature documentaries.
 Anne Stedman as Woman
 Googy Gress as Bear Announcer
 Trevor Denman as Horse Race Announcer
 Lawrence Pressman as Governor of California (uncredited)

Voice cast

Animal cast
 Tank the Bear as Archie
 Little Bart the Bear as Boy Bear Cub
 Honey-Bump Bear as Girl Bear Cub
 Crystal the Monkey as Drunk Monkey

Music

Soundtrack

A soundtrack containing hip hop and R&B music was released on June 5, 2001 by J Records. It peaked at 76 on the Billboard 200, 26 on the Top R&B/Hip-Hop Albums, and 10 on the Top Soundtracks. Five singles were spawned from the album, "Do U Wanna Roll (Dolittle Theme)", "Cluck Cluck", "Absolutely Not", "We Fit Together" and "Life Is Good". Allmusic rated this soundtrack four stars out of five.

Information taken from Dr. Dolittle 2: Original Soundtrack liner notes:

Sample credits
 "Do U Wanna Roll (Dolittle Theme)" contains an interpolation of "Doo Wa Ditty (Blow That Thing)" (R. Troutman, L. Troutman), performed by Zapp 
 "What It Is (Part II)" contains replayed elements from "Children's Story" (R. Walters), performed by Slick Rick
Notes
The song "Life Is Good" did not appear in the film.

Reception

Box office
On its opening weekend, the film grossed $25,037,039 from 3,049 theaters in the United States and Canada, ranking #2 at the box office, behind The Fast and the Furious. Like the first film, it was the best debut for a Fox film that week. By the end of its run, Dr. Dolittle 2 had grossed $112,952,899 domestically and $63,151,445 internationally, totaling $176,104,344 worldwide.

Critical response
Like the 1998 version, Dr Dolittle 2 received mixed reviews from critics. On Rotten Tomatoes the film has an approval rating of 42% based on reviews from 107 critics, with an average rating of 5.00/10. The site's critics consensus reads: "Although there are laughs to be had in Dr. Dolittle 2, its preoccupation with toilet humor and Murphy's restrained performance makes this a missed opportunity". On Metacritic, the film has a weighted average score of 49 out of 100 based on reviews from 28 critics, indicating "mixed or average reviews". Audiences surveyed by CinemaScore gave the film a grade "B+" on scale of A to F.

Joe Leydon of Variety said "the film has all the symptoms of a sure-fire smash hit", noting that it was more-family than its predecessor, and that "Eddie Murphy [is] once again in fine form".
Roger Ebert of the Chicago Sun-Times gave it 3 out of 4, calling it "cute, crude and good-hearted movie". Rita Kempley of The Washington Post praised Eddie Murphy saying that after having been upstaged by the animals in the first film "brings bite as well as bark to the funnier sequel". Desson Thomson also of The Washington Post did not find the film funny, called it forgettable and thought it should have gone straight to video.

Home media
Dr. Dolittle 2 was released on VHS and DVD on October 23, 2001 and generated $7.32 million in its first week in stores.

References

External links

 
 
 

2001 films
American sequel films
American buddy comedy films
American fantasy comedy films
2000s English-language films
Doctor Dolittle films
20th Century Fox films
Davis Entertainment films
Films shot in Alaska
Films set in San Francisco
Films set in the San Francisco Bay Area
Films shot in San Francisco
Films directed by Steve Carr
Films about animal rights
Films scored by David Newman
African-American films
Films about raccoons
Films about dogs
Films about bears
Films produced by John Davis
American children's comedy films
2000s American films
2000s buddy comedy films